John Gordon Eliott (24 January 1872 – 16 May 1948) was a Reform Party Member of Parliament in New Zealand.

He was elected to the Oroua electorate in the 1925 general election, but was defeated in 1928.

He had four children, one was also named John Gordon and served in World War I.

References

1872 births
1948 deaths
Reform Party (New Zealand) MPs
Members of the New Zealand House of Representatives
New Zealand MPs for North Island electorates
Unsuccessful candidates in the 1928 New Zealand general election